Yeast Nation (The Triumph of Life) is a musical that premiered in 2007, with music by Mark Hollmann, lyrics by Hollmann and Greg Kotis, and book by Kotis. It serves as the first part of a musical trilogy, with the middle installment being Hollmann and Kotis' previous Tony Award-winning musical Urinetown.

Productions
Yeast Nation had its debut run from October 5 to November 3, 2007 at the Perseverance Theatre in Juneau, Alaska, under the direction of PJ Paparelli. The musical was next produced in 2009 by the American Theater Company in Chicago, again under the direction of Paparelli.

It was then part of the 2011 New York International Fringe Festival, where it was awarded the FringeNYC Overall Excellence Award for overall production of a musical. The cast included Harriet Harris (as Jan-the-Unnamed), Kimiko Glenn (as The New One), Manu Narayan (as Jan-the-Wise), Joy Suprano (as Jan-the-Sly), and Rick Crom (as Jan-the-Youngest). The musical has since been staged by Ray of Light Theatre in San Francisco in 2014, and New Line Theatre in St. Louis in June 2018.

The European premiere was staged at Southwark Playhouse, London from July 22, 2022 to August 27,2022.

History
Hollmann and Kotis had publicly discussed their efforts in working on a Urinetown sequel or prequel as early as 2004. A private industry reading of an early draft of the show was performed at the Manhattan Theatre Club in New York City on October 21, 2005. Urinetown alums Hunter Foster and Nancy Opel were among the cast, and the private performance was directed by John Rando.

Characters
Jan-the-Elder
Jan-the-Second-Oldest
Jan-the-Famished
Jan-the-Sly
Jan-the-Sweet
Jan-the-Unnamed
Jan-the-Wise
Jan-the-Wretched
Jan-the-Youngest
The New One

Musical numbers 

Act I
 Hear the Song – Jan-the-Unnamed and Company
 You Are My Children - Jan-the-Elder and Company
 Burnin’ Soul - Jan-the-Sweet and Jan-the-Second-Oldest
 I'll Change the World Around Her - Jan-the-Second-Oldest
 Little Sister - Jan-the-Sly and Jan-the-Famished
 Alone - Jan-the-Elder, Jan-the-Wise, Jan-the-Second-Oldest, and Jan-the-Sweet
 Let Us Rise - Jan-the-Second-Oldest and Jan-the-Sweet
 Stasis is the Membrane - Jan-the-Sly, Jan-the-Famished, Jan-the-Wise, and Company
 Liar - Jan-the-Wise and Jan-the-Sweet
 Act I Finale - Company

Act II
 You Don't Know a Thing About Love - Jan-the-Unnamed and Company
 Me Good - The New One, Jan-the-Elder, and Company
 Don't Be a Traitor to Love - Jan-the-Sly and Jan-the-Wise
 You're Not the Yeast You Used to Be - Jan-the-Second-Oldest and Jan-the-Sweet
 Love Equals Pain - Jan-the-Unnamed, Jan-the-Sweet, and Chorus
 Let Us Rise Reprise - Jan-the-Elder and The New One
 Doom! Love! Doom! - Jan-the-Elder and Company
 Look at What Love Made Me Do - Company
 Life Goes On - Jan-the-Wise, Jan-the-Sweet, and Jan-the-Second-Oldest
 The World Won't Wait - Jan-the-Sweet, Jan-the-Second-Oldest, Jan-the-Unnamed, and Company

Reception 

Variety gave a positive review to the 2009 Chicago production, saying that Hollmann and Kotis "toy with storytelling cliches to make them both function dramatically and seem fresh." The New York Times wrote of the 2011 Fringe Festival production that "The jokes veer from broad to brainy, and Mark Hollmann’s music is rock pastiche, but this is the rare satire that knows precisely what it’s sending up and commits to it." TalkinBroadway.com said of the 2014 San Francisco production that "the concept, execution, cast and design are all well done," but that the show "still looks like a work in progress."

References

External links 
 Interview with Hollmann and Kotis
 Variety review of 2009 Chicago production
 Backstage review of 2011 NYFF production
 "Premise of new musical 'Yeast Nation’ has brows rising", SFGate.com
 Review of 2014 San Francisco production

Original musicals
2007 musicals
Science fiction musicals